Carlo Vitrano (10 January 1938 – 10 November 2020) was an Italian wrestler. He competed in the men's freestyle flyweight at the 1960 Summer Olympics.

References

1938 births
Living people
Italian male sport wrestlers
Olympic wrestlers of Italy
Wrestlers at the 1960 Summer Olympics
Sportspeople from Palermo